Zoltán Žebík (born 3 August 1992) is a retired Slovak footballer who last played for 2. liga club FC VSS Košice as a centre back.

Club career

MFK Košice
Žebík made his professional Fortuna Liga's debut for MFK Košice on April 18, 2015 against DAC Dunajská Streda.

References

External links
 MFK Košice profile
 
 Futbalnet profile

1992 births
Living people
Slovak footballers
Association football defenders
FC VSS Košice players
MFK Zemplín Michalovce players
FK Bodva Moldava nad Bodvou players
Slovak Super Liga players